Karim Antoine Habib (born 1970) is a Canadian automotive designer of Lebanese descent, currently Executive Vice President and Head of Kia global design for the Korean vehicle manufacturer Kia. He previously worked for BMW and Infiniti. He is fluent in Arabic, English, French, German, and Italian.

Career 
Born in Lebanon, Habib had to leave the country due to the ensueing civil war and moved to Canada in his teenage years, and was educated at McGill University, as well as Transportation Design at the Art Center College of Design.

In 1998, he was hired by BMW. He got his first break at BMW designing the interior of the E60 5 Series. Later he designed the exterior of the BMW 7 Series F01. He left to work for Mercedes-Benz in 2009 for a few years and came back to BMW in 2011 as exterior designer until January 2017.

He started employment with Infiniti in July 2017 and left the company in August 2019, being replaced by Taisuke Nakamura.

In September 2019, Habib joined Kia as Senior Vice President and Head of Kia Design Center.

Notable works 
 Mercedes-Benz F800
 BMW CS Concept
 BMW 7 Series (F01)
 BMW 7 Series (G11)
 BMW X6
 BMW X3
 BMW 5 Series (E60) (interior)
 Infiniti Q Inspiration Concept
 Kia Sorento (MQ4)
 Kia Optima/K5 (DL3)
 Kia Carnival (KA4)
 Kia EV6
 Kia Sonet (QY)
 Kia Carens (KY)
 Kia K8 (GL3)

References 

1970 births
Canadian people of Lebanese descent
BMW designers
McGill University alumni
Canadian expatriates in Germany
Living people